Larry Lee Vognild (January 21, 1932 – January 3, 2014) was an American firefighter and politician.

Vognild was a member of the Everett, Washington fire department. He served in the Washington State Senate from 1978 until 1994 as a Democrat. He died only 18 days before his 82nd birthday.

Notes

1932 births
2014 deaths
Politicians from Everett, Washington
Democratic Party Washington (state) state senators
Politicians from Spokane, Washington
American firefighters